"Let Me Be" is a song by Daryl Braithwaite, released as a single from his 1988 album Edge. It was released in April 1989 and peaked at number 26 in June 1989.

Track listing
CD single
 Side 1 "Let Me Be" – 5:36
 Side 2 "It's All in the Music" – 3:40

Charts

References

1989 singles
1989 songs
CBS Records singles
Song recordings produced by Simon Hussey
Songs written by Simon Hussey